Zachariah School is a historic Rosenwald School building located near Wooten's Crossroads, Greene County, North Carolina.  It was built in 1920, and is a one-story, frame building sheathed in weatherboard and containing three classrooms.  An auditorium was added in 1921, but removed about 1967–1969. Zachariah School closed in 1956. The Zachariah School is one of five schools that were constructed using Rosenwald funds in Greene County, including the Snow Hill Colored High School.

It was listed on the National Register of Historic Places in 2005.

References

African-American history of North Carolina
Rosenwald schools in North Carolina
School buildings on the National Register of Historic Places in North Carolina
School buildings completed in 1921
Buildings and structures in Greene County, North Carolina
National Register of Historic Places in Greene County, North Carolina
1921 establishments in North Carolina